The Order of Duke Domagoj is the 8th most important medal given by the Republic of Croatia and is the nation's highest award for bravery. The order was founded on April 1, 1995. The medal is awarded for valor in combat. It is named after duke Domagoj of Croatia.

Appearance and Wear
The order comprises a pure silver oval, 40 mm high and 50 mm wide, in the middle of which kneels a naked archer, fashioned from gold, his right foot tucked under his buttocks, his left stretched out. Below the archer is a semi-circular ornament in the form of a wave with the inscription KNEZ DOMAGOJ (PRINCE DOMAGOJ). At the top sits the coat of arms of Croatia, above diagonally crossed swords. The reverse is smooth with the Croatian wattle in the centre containing the inscription REPUBLIKA HRVATSKA (REPUBLIC OF CROATIA). At the upper tip of the religious symbol, on the coat of arms, there is a hitch for the ribbon.

The neckband is 36 mm wide and 600 mm long and shows the colors of the Croatian coat of arms, a red-silver check. The accompanying miniature is normally worn as a medal on the upper left breast.

Notable Recipients
Rahim Ademi - Croatian general indicted, and subsequently cleared of war crimes by the International Criminal Tribunal for the Former Yugoslavia (ICTY).
Ante Gotovina - Croatian general indicted and cleared of war crimes by the ICTY.
Ante Kotromanović - Croatian Minister of Defence (since 2011)
Drago Lovrić - Chief of Staff of Croatian Armed Forces (since 2011)
Franjo Tuđman - President of Croatia (1990–1999)
Anton Tus - Chief of Staff of Croatian Armed Forces (1991–1992)
Mark Nicholas Gray - British Royal Marine who reduced the water level in the Peruća Lake, preventing the collapse of the Peruća Hydroelectric Dam.
Predrag Matić - Croatian Minister of Veterans’ Affairs (2011–2016)
Andrija Andabak - Croatian soldier

References 

Orders, decorations, and medals of Croatia
 
1995 establishments in Croatia
Awards established in 1995